is the popular name given to the Spanish University Admission Tests ("", E.v.A.U.), a non-compulsory exam taken by students after secondary school, necessary to get into University. Students must take six 90-minute written exams over three days in June or September, consisting of common and specific subjects taken in "" (the last two non-compulsory years of secondary education).  exams are set by the Public Universities of each autonomous community and allow students access to the Spanish university system.

Subjects (before 2009)

Common Subjects 
 Spanish language and literature
 First foreign language (mainly English, non oral, rarely French, German, Italian or Portuguese)
 History of Spain
 Galician, Catalan or Valencian  and Basque are also common subjects in Galicia; Catalonia and Balearic Islands, Valencia; and the Basque Country, respectively.
Selectividad or Scholastic Aptitude Test is accepted by USA universities if accompanied by TOEFL English exam.

Specific Subjects 
Arts:
 Artistic Drawing
 History of Art
 Choose between Graphic Expression Techniques or Image
Humanities:
 Latin
 History of Art
 Choose between: Ancient Greek, Geography, History of Music, Catalan / Spanish Literature or History of Philosophy
Social Sciences:
 Applied Mathematics
 Economy and Business Administration
 Geography
Sciences and Engineering:
 Physics
 Mathematics
 Choose between: Chemistry, Technical Drawing, Industrial Technology, Electrotechnics or Mechanics
Nature Sciences:
 Chemistry
 Biology
 Choose between: Mathematics, Physics or Environmental Sciences
Mathematics is compulsory for all sciences options

Since 2010 

In 2009/2010, Selectividad exams changed. Now, these exams have two parts:

Common part 

Everybody has to do this part, and it consists in 4 compulsory tests (5 in case of Galicia, Catalonia, Valencia, the Basque Country and Balearic Islands)

 First foreign language (English, French, Italian, German or Portuguese)
 History of Spain or History of philosophy (must take History of Spain since 2018)
 Spanish Language and Literature.
 Galician, Catalan, Valencian  and Basque are also common subjects in Galicia; Catalonia and Balearic Islands, Valencia; and the Basque Country, respectively
 A subject from your specific "Bachillerato"

Specific part 

In this part the students can choose between 2 and 4 subjects (whatever you want depending on your specific "Bachillerato" and the specific weights published by each university) and can obtain a maximum of 4 extra points.

The exam 
Exams usually have four (like Technical Drawing) or five (like Physics) questions or problems in science-focused subjects. Other subjects, such as Spanish Language and Literature or History of Philosophy consist on a text which requires a writing task about it, theory questions and vocabulary.
Every exam has two different options, A and B. The student must choose one and answer every question on that option. For some areas, like Physics or Chemistry, a table with constants (like Gravity Constant or Avogradro Number) is given. In "Matemáticas orientadas a las Ciencias Sociales" (Applied Math) a table with the standard deviation is given.

Students can carry different materials depending on the exam:
 A ruler, a set of triangles and a compass for Technical Drawing.
 A scientific, non-graphic, non-programmable calculator for Mathematics, Applied Math, Physics, Chemistry, Economics, and Industrial Technology.
 Latin Dictionary for the Latin Exam.

Grading 
With the new Selectividad exam, the final mark is no longer the average score of the six exams taken. Now, the four marks achieved in the Common Part are taken and an average score up to 10 points is given. Then, each University establishes different parameters for the other subjects taken in the Specific Part.
For example, a student who took Spanish, English, History and Math got an average score of 8.55. Then they took Physics and Chemistry exams, and got a 9 and a 7. They want to study Architecture, and the University they want to study at considers Physics more important than Chemistry at that degree, so their 9 will turn into 1.8 additional points (9*0.2) and Chemistry in 0.7 more points (7*0.1). The final score will be 8.55+1.8+0.7=11.05 out of 14 points possible.
Other example: another student gets a 9 in the Common Part, and then she takes Economics and Physics. She will finally study Law, so her Physics score will likely not to have effect in her final score, but Economics will be awarded with a 0.15 or 0.20 multiplier.

The mark in the Common Part lasts forever, but the one in the Specific Part needs to be renewed after two years if needed.

Grade = (g.p.a in Bachillerato * 0.6) + (arithmetic mean of the grades obtained in the general part * 0.4) + (Specific part Exam I * a) + (Specific part Exam II * b)

Where a and b are the weight (0, 0.1 or 0.2) of that specific test for the course and university you are applying for. The maximum grade is therefore 14.

External links 

 SelectividadOnline: information about selectividad, examinations, statistics, dates, inscription, notes, quizs, news, universities,...
 Examinations from: 2006, 2005 and 2004.
 Contents for the selectivity exam preparation. The pass to the University

Standardized tests
Education in Spain